Bittenbender Covered Bridge was a historic wooden covered bridge in Huntington Township, Luzerne County, Pennsylvania. It had rough vertical plank siding, crossed Huntington Creek, and was the last covered bridge in Luzerne County.

It was listed on the National Register of Historic Places in 1980. The bridge was destroyed in a flood on June 28, 2006.

References 

Covered bridges on the National Register of Historic Places in Pennsylvania
Covered bridges in Luzerne County, Pennsylvania
Bridges completed in 1888
Wooden bridges in Pennsylvania
Tourist attractions in Luzerne County, Pennsylvania
National Register of Historic Places in Luzerne County, Pennsylvania
Road bridges on the National Register of Historic Places in Pennsylvania
Queen post truss bridges in the United States
Buildings and structures destroyed by flooding
1888 establishments in Pennsylvania
2006 disestablishments in Pennsylvania